The following highways are numbered 908:

United States
Maryland
 Maryland Route 908

South Carolina
  South Carolina Highway 908

Territories
  Puerto Rico Highway 908

Washington
 Washington State Route 908